George Burr Richardson, MS, PhD (1872 - 1949) was a geologist who, among other endeavors, participated in extensive field work for the United States Geological Survey (USGS) in Alaska, Pennsylvania, California, Texas, Colorado, and Utah.

In Texas, Dr. Richardson described and named 14 geologic formations, 10 from the Cambrian to Lower Cretaceous ages, and two each of the Paleozoic and Precambrian ages. These contributions to stratigraphy formed the basis of all subsequent stratigraphic work in north and west Texas and southeastern New Mexico. Moreover, they led to the identification and development of areas of great economic importance, despite being 10,000 or more feet underground. Dr. Richardson's work led to authorship of 70 publications related to geology.

Early life
"G.B", as George Burr Richardson was known to associates, was born August 21, 1872, in Morrisania, a suburb of New York City. His father, George Wentworth Richardson, was a descendant of Samuel Richardson, who was born in England and immigrated to Woburn, Massachusetts, about 1635. Following generations included selectmen in Woburn and Charles Richardson, who was an architect and designed the courthouse in Worcester, Massachusetts, about 1780. "G.B."'s grandfather moved to Claremont, New Hampshire, where "G.B."'s father was born and lived until he moved to Morrisania.

"G.B."'s mother, Emma Breck, was a descendant of Edward Breck, who emigrated from England to Boston on the James. Following generations were merchants living in Boston until about 1800, when Emma's grandfather, William Breck, moved to Claremont, New Hampshire. Emma's father, James Breck, moved from Claremont to nearby Newport, New Hampshire, where Emma was born and lived until she married George Wentworth Richardson. One of Emma's great great grandfathers was Samuel Chase (1741-1811), a jurist and a signer of the Declaration of Independence, as well as great grandfather of Chief Justice Salmon P. Chase (1803-1873).

Soon after "G.B."'s birth, his family moved to Chestnut Hill, Mt. Vernon, in Westchester County, where "G.B." grew up with a sister, Chester Parker Richardson and a brother, James Breck Richardson. His father died in 1881, when "G.B." was nine years old. "G.B." attended public schools and the College of the City of New York. Then, in 1892, he matriculated at Lawrence Scientific School of Harvard University, where he helped earn his way by tutoring Latin and working as an Assistant in the Physics Department, and where he was awarded a BS degree magna cum laude in 1895.

Career
Subsequently, "G.B." worked as a chemist at the Warren Paper Mills in Portland, Maine, but by the end of his first winter there, he decided that he wanted the outdoor life of a geologist, rather than the indoor life of a chemist. Harvard professor Dr. Shaler, who was much-admired by "G.B.", influenced that decision.

Thus in June 1896, "G.B." began graduate studies at Harvard on a one-year Thayer Scholarship. From July through September, 1896 he worked as a geologic aide to Professor J.B. Woodworth, a member of Professor Shaler's group that was surveying the Triassic coal basin near Richmond, Virginia, where coal and coke had been mined during Colonial days.

Following his year of graduate work, "G.B." assisted J.A. Taff. From July through November, 1897 he helped Taff with field work in Indian Territory, and from January through June, 1898 he worked in Taff's office in Washington, D.C. In 1898, Harvard first established an MS degree, and it was awarded to "G.B." on the basis of his prior graduate studies there.

From June through December, 1898 "G.B." examined gold prospects in the Stikane District of British Columbia for the Cassiar Central Railway of London. Then, from July through September, 1899 he assisted N.H. Darton with field work in South Dakota. That September he began graduate studies as a Fellow in Geology at Johns Hopkins University. There, he was honored by membership in Phi Beta Kappa and qualified for a PhD after one year, though he was not awarded the degree until June 1901. His dissertation was A Study of the Red Beds of the Black Hills of South Dakota and Wyoming.

From spring until mid-September, 1900 Richardson worked with a USGS party led by Alfred H. Brooks (after whom Brooks Range in Alaska is named) that explored the Seward Peninsula, Alaska, and examined in detail the Ophir Creek, Kojsuktapaga, Topkok, and Solomon River mining districts. Afterwards he spent 10 days working in the Nome area during the peak of gold excitement there. On October 29, 1900, he was appointed Assistant Geologist by the USGS.

Next, Richardson worked under Marius R. Campbell in the coal, gas, and oil-field area of western Pennsylvania. Richardson adopted Campbell's unique field methodology and the two became lifelong friends. Richardson was assigned the Indiana quadrangle, which is about 235 square miles. In two and a half months, he discovered that the so-called (by the Second Pennsylvania Geological Survey)"Indiana anticline" is a syncline. He did so by combining results of his areal mapping with subsurface data from logs of exploratory wells that coal, gas, and oil operators made available to him. During subsequent "office seasons" of winter, Richardson prepared the text and illustrations of the Indiana folio, which was published in 1904. It was the third folio of the Geologic Atlas of the United States, which was a product of a co-operative program between the Pennsylvania Topographic and Geologic Commission and the Federal Survey. Richardson later completed reports on five other quadrangles in that region: the New Kensington quadrangle (published 1932), the Somerset and Windber quadrangles (published 1935), the Butler and Zellienople quadrangles (published 1936).

In 1902, from July into October, Richardson did field work in California. There, he, H.R. Johnson, Chester Washburne, and Frank L. Hess assisted J. S. Diller in mapping the areal geology of the Redding quadrangle.

In June 1903, Richardson was transferred to the Western Section of Hydrology, to participate in a joint project with the State Mineral Survey of Texas, directed by W. B. Phillips, to determine the prospect of obtaining water from deep wells in state-owned areas of school lands in El Paso and Reeves counties. The area included about 9,000 square miles and a sequence of about 8,500 feet of rocks. Richardson completed the reconnaissance in six months, assisted by a student from the University of Texas, E. H. Elder, half of the time. The report was published in November 1904 as Bulletin 9 of the University of Texas Mineral Survey. It includes Richardson's stratigraphic work mentioned at the beginning of this article. Recognizing the need for additional geological work in the area, Richardson later was authorized to undertake more detailed surveys of the El Paso and Van Horn quadrangles, which were published as folios of the Geologic Atlas of the United States in 1909 and 1914

From 1904 into 1907, Richardson worked on geological problems in Utah. Initially, the focus was underground water in the valleys of Utah Lake, Jordan River, Sanpete, and Sevier. However, in 1906, after the Secretary of the Interior withdrew entry from extensive areas of supposed coal lands in Western States, Richardson's work changed focus to the examination and mapping of coal fields as a basis for classification and valuation of public coal lands. That year, Richardson, assisted by W. D. Neal, Leon J. Pepperburg, and C. D. Parrin, made a detailed reconnaissance of the Book Cliffs coal field, between Grand River, Colorado, and Sunnyside, Utah. The final report, USGS Bulletin 371, describes the topography, the stratigraphy, the structure of the field, and the occurrence, character, and development of the coal beds, as well as the quality of coal. Richardson also examined other areas in Utah, which led to his reports on coal in Sanpete County, natural gas near Salt Lake City, antimony in southern Utah, the Harmony, Colob, and Kanab coal fields, and petroleum in southern Utah.

From 1919 to 1932, Richardson was in charge of petroleum and natural gas statistics for the USGS. Also, from 1920 to 1939, he supervised preparation of the oil and gas field maps of California, Illinois, Kansas, Kentucky, Louisiana, Oklahoma, Texas, the United States, West Virginia, and Wyoming, all of which were published by the USGS. Success of this work necessitated that Richardson acquire and maintain the confidence and co-operation of al pertinent oil and gas field operators.

For several years beginning in 1934, Richardson compiled information for various Congressional committees. Perhaps his most outstanding work in this regard (done in collaboration with Hugh D. Miser and Carl H. Dane) was the chapter Petroleum Reserves, published in 1939 in Energy Resources and National Policy.

Personal life
As well as having a rich professional life, George Burr Richardson also had a rich personal life, which, like his professional life, was unobtrusive. On June 23, 1904, "G.B." married Irene Dashiell of Columbus, Mississippi. In 1898, Miss Dashiell had come to Washington to be official hostess for her uncle, Judge Charles B. Howry of the U.S. Court of claims. Subsequently, she worked as librarian in the War Department until her marriage to "G.B." at the home of her sister in Birmingham, Alabama. After the wedding, Irene delighted in accompanying "G.B." on his summer field work, which entailed living in camp, and travelling by horses and covered wagons. She accompanied "G.B." for 10 summers until their only child, Alice, was born September 20, 1913.

At the time of their 48th wedding anniversary in June, 1948, Dr. Richardson wrote that Mrs. Richardson "made my life ideally happy." Mrs. Richardson died January 10, 1949, and Dr. Richardson died three months later on March 18, 1949. He was survived by his brother, his sister, and his one child, Alice, who by then had married Edward Russell True and had two children, Lawrence Dashiell True and Peter Russell True, with a third, Alice Wentworth True, on the way.

Dr. Richardson was a member of All Souls Memorial Church (Episcopal), the American Association for the Advancement of Science, the American Association of Petroleum Geologists, the Washington Academy of Sciences, the Geological Society of Washington, Phi Kappa Phi, the Cosmos Club, and the Chevy Chase Club.

He was quiet, congenial, and obliging. Without protest, he accepted assignments that involved much drudgery. His reports were factual, non-speculative, and concise. According to co-worker James H. Gardner, he thoroughly enjoyed geological discussions and, during times of field work, he often would lead heated arguments around evening campfires. Any animosity that ensued was readily dissolved by his hearty, appealing chuckle. He was a conscientious worker, universally liked and respected, ever polite and kind. Constance Shanner Evans, statistical clerk under him during World War I wrote, "Dr. Richardson always stressed the importance of having an inquiring mind. When I first went into his office he gave me an advanced copy of Logic to read, and every few weeks asked how I was getting along with it. He was always thinking of something new -- ways to improve the work. He was more interested in geology than in statistics. He was a gentleman and a scholar, who thought it a great privilege to work for the government."

Other sources of great enjoyment to Dr. Richardson were Shakespeare, poetry, biography, and classical music. Leather-bound volumes of Shakespeare's plays were his main reading material on summer field trips. And Beethoven's concertos provided comfort and pleasure until the week of his death. He was unobtrusively religious and considered entering the ministry when at college. His two trips abroad, seeing art galleries and cathedrals in Europe, provided great joy. Also, he enjoyed golf and loved the great outdoors. In later years he spent nearly every summer on the New England Coast, where he could enjoy both.

References
Notes

Bibliography
Richards RW. Memorial to George Burr Richardson. Proceedings Volume of The Geological Society of America Annual Report for 1951 July 1952: 135-140.
Brooks AH, Richardson GB, Collier AJ. A reconnaissance of the Cape Nome and adjacent gold fields of Seward Peninsula, Alaska, in 1900. In: Reconnaissances in the Cape Nome and Norton Bay regions, Alaska, in 1900. USGS, special publication 1901: 1-180.
Richardson GB. The upper red beds of the Black Hills. Journal of Geology 1903;10:700-702.
Richardson GB. Description of the Indiana quadrangle, Pennsylvania. In: Geologic Atlas, Indiana folio 102, USGS 1904.
Richardson GB. Geology and coal, oil and gas resources of the new Kensington quadrangle, Pennsylvania. Bulletin 829, USGS 1932.
Richardson GB. Description of the Somerset and Windber quadrangles, Pennsylvania. In: Geologic Atlas, Somerset-Windber folio 224, USGS 1935.
Richardson GB. Geology and mineral resources of the Butler and Zellienople quadrangles, Pennsylvania. Bulletin 873. USGS 1936
Richardson GB. Report of a reconnaissance in trans-Pecos Texas, north of the Texas and Pacific Railway. Mineral Survey, Bulletin 9, University of Texas 1904.
Richardson GB. Description of the El Paso quadrangle, Texas. In: Geologic Atlas, El Paso folio 166. USGS 1909.
Richardson GB. Description of the Van Horn quadrangle, Texas. In: Geologic Atlas, Van Horn folio 194. USGS 1914.
Richardson GB. Underground water in the valleys of Utah Lake and Jordan river, Utah. Water Supply Paper 157, USGS 1906.
Richardson GB. Underground water in Sanpete and central Sevier valley, Utah. Water Supply Paper 199, USGS 1907.
Richardson GB. The Book Cliffs coal fields, between Grand River, Colorado, and Sunnyside, Utah. Bulletin 316. USGS 1907.
Richardson GB. Reconnaissance of the Book Cliffs coal field between Grand River, Colorado, and Sunnyside, Utah. Bulletin 371. USGS 1909.
Richardson GB. Coal in Sanpete County, Utah. bulletin 285. USGS 1906.
Richardson GB. Natural gas near Salt Lake City, Utah. Bulletin 260. USGS 1905.
Richardson GB. Antimony in southern Utah. Bulletin 340. USGS 1908.
Richardson GB. The Harmony, Colob and Kanab coal fields, southern Utah. Bulletin 341. USGS 1909.
Richardson GB. Petroleum in southern Utah. Bulletin 340. USGS 1908.
Petroleum reserves. In: Energy resources and national policy. Report of the Energy resources committee to the National Resource Committee, H. Doc. 160, pp 286–294.

1872 births
1949 deaths
American geologists
Harvard University alumni
Scientists from the Bronx